Romain Gagliazzo is a French rugby league footballer who represented France in the 2000 World Cup.

Playing career
Gagliazzo has played for both the Villeneuve Leopards and AS Carcassonne clubs in the French rugby league championship. He has played at representative level for France on fourteen occasions between 1999 and 2009, including at the 2000 World Cup and 2009 Four Nations.

References

Living people
AS Carcassonne players
Catalans Dragons players
French rugby league players
France national rugby league team players
Rugby league props
Year of birth missing (living people)
Place of birth missing (living people)
Villeneuve Leopards players